Simone Naomi Charley (born February 4, 1995) is an American professional soccer player and track and field athlete who currently plays for Angel City FC of the National Women's Soccer League (NWSL).

Early years
Charley was born to Sharon and Bobby Charley in Boston, Massachusetts and grew up in Hoover, Alabama. Her maternal family is originally from Montserrat. She was born into a sports family, her older sister Nicole having been a triple jumper at Auburn, her older brother Myles a triple jumper and long jumper at Troy and her cousin Damian an American football player at Vanderbilt.  Charley is a natural athlete herself, and excelled at the high school and university level in both soccer and track and field.  During her high school career she won nine state championships in both sports, was named 2011 Gatorade Player of the Year (soccer) and 2012 Birmingham News Female Athlete of the Year.  She also excelled academically.

College career
Charley attended Vanderbilt University for five years.  During that time she was a student-athlete for the Vanderbilt Commodores in soccer, indoor track and outdoor track. Due to her prolific athletic career Charley was named to the 2019 Southeastern Conference Class of Women's Legends. While at Vanderbilt University Charley earned a bachelor's degree with a double-majored in psychology and sociology and a master's degree in medicine, health and society.

College soccer, 2013–2017
During her soccer career at Vanderbilt,Charley made 76 appearances and finished with 25 goals and 18 assists.   Her 2013 freshman year saw her finish the year as the team's leader in points and goals.  She was named to the SEC All-Freshman Team and SEC First-Year Academic Honor Roll.  Charley repeated her team leader in goals her sophomore year and was named to the First Team All-SEC team and Fall SEC Academic Honor Roll.  Her 2015-year saw her named to the All-South Region First Team and Second Team All-SEC.  Charley redshirted the 2016 season in soccer.  She returned to the soccer team for her senior year in 2017.  She finished the year as team leader in points.  She was named to the Second Team All-SEC and All-Southeast Region and made the Fall SEC Academic Honor Roll.

College Track and Field, 2014–2017
While attending Vanderbilt Charley also competed in both indoor and outdoor seasons of track and field in the triple jump.  Her freshman indoor season saw her post the second-best mark on Vanderbilt's all-time performance for the triple jump (41'8.50").  She broke her own school record in the 2014 outdoor season, setting a then lifetime best of (43'2.50"), missing qualification for the IAAF World Championship by one centimetre. She finished her freshman year named to the 2014 Outdoor NCAA Second-Team All-American and 2014 USTFCCCA All-Academic Team.  During her sophomore year she again broke both her own indoor and outdoor school record in the triple jump, with jumps of (43'5.25") and (43'8.55") respectively.  Indoor she had a fifth best nationally at the time which earned her All-SEC honors. Charley also earned NCAA First-Team All-American honors for both her indoor and outdoor 2015 season.  She repeated this double NCAA First Team All-American honors during her junior 2016 seasons.  She also again repeated her breaking of her own person and school records with jumps of (44'0") in her indoor season and (45'2.75") during her outdoor season.   Her final track season was the 2017 indoor season, where Charley again broke her school and personal record with a triple jump of (44'5.25").  She finished her last season earning a third consecutive indoor NCAA First Team All-American honor.

Professional career

Portland Thorns, 2019–2021
Charley went undrafted in the 2018 NWSL College Draft.  She was however picked up by the Portland Thorns FC, making the practice squad for 2018 as a non-roster invitee.  She was signed by the team in May 2019 as a supplemental player.  Charley made her first start on May 25, 2019, against Sky Blue FC.  She provided two assists during her second start against the Chicago Red Stars.

Angel City FC, 2021–
On December 8, 2021, Charley was traded to Angel City FC.

Career statistics 
As of June 2, 2019

Honors and awards

Team
Portland Thorns FC
 International Champions Cup: 2021

Social media
Instagram
Twitter

References

External links
 NWSL
 Portland Thorns
 Soccerway

Living people
1995 births
American women's soccer players
Vanderbilt Commodores women's soccer players
Vanderbilt Commodores track and field
National Women's Soccer League players
Soccer players from Massachusetts
Soccer players from Birmingham, Alabama
Women's association football forwards
Portland Thorns FC players
Canberra United FC players
American expatriate women's soccer players
Expatriate women's soccer players in Australia
American expatriate sportspeople in Australia
African-American women's soccer players
American people of Montserratian descent
Angel City FC players